was a Japanese actor. Nagoya was an actor who specialized in playing comical roles. He is known for playing the role of Yūtarō Asahina in the tokusatsu superhero series Ultraman Taro.

Filmography

Films
 Non-chan Kumo ni Noru (1955) as Driver
 Akitsu Springs (1960) as Shimamura
 High and Low (1963) as Yamamoto (Detective)
 Shitamachi no Taiyō (1963) as Kazama
 Sweet Sweat (1964) as Jirō
 Blood and Sand  (1965) as Nezu
 Flying Phantom Ship (1969) as Technician Arashiyama (voice)
 The Human Revolution (1973) as Kurikawa
 Tidal Wave (1973) as D-2 Security
 Shunkinshō (1976) as Densuke
 Mr- Mrs- Ms- Lonely (1980) as Hanamori
 Station (1981) as Takada
 Dotonbori River (1982) as Katsu-san
 Suspicion (1982) as Iwasaki
 Mahjong hōrōki (1984) 
 Kaitō Ruby (1988) as Man with white cloth
 Tsuribaka Nisshi (1988) as Noguchi
 Princess Goh (1992) as Torii
  (1997) as Hatano
 Princess Mononoke (1997) as The cattleman leader (voice)

Television drama
 Taikōki (1965)
 Ten to Chi to (1969) as Yosaburō Kakizaki
 Return of Ultraman (1971-72) (Narrator)
 Ultraman Taro (1973-74) as Yūtarō Asahina
 Kunitori Monogatari (1973) as Gonzō Kani
 Oretachi no Tabi (1975) as Daigorō Sakata
 School Wars: Hero (1984) as Kuniyasu Iwasa
 Shūchakueki Series (1996-2004) as Sakamoto
 The Unfettered Shogun (1999-2003) as Hikozaemon Arima

Japanese dub
 Toy Story (1995) as Mr. Potato Head
 Toy Story 2 (1999) as Mr. Potato Head

References

External links
 
Akira Nagoya NHK

Japanese male film actors
20th-century Japanese male actors
1930 births
2003 deaths